Myioclura is a genus of parasitic flies in the family Tachinidae.

Species
Myioclura melusina Reinhard, 1975
Myioclura necopina Reinhard, 1975

References

Diptera of North America
Dexiinae
Tachinidae genera